Matthew Moore House is historic home located at Moores Springs, Stokes County, North Carolina. It was built about 1786, and is a small -story brick cottage on a raised fieldstone basement. It has segmental-arched openings and the interior follows a simple Quaker plans.  It was the home of Matthew Moore, an early and prominent settler and a large landowner in Stokes County.

It was added to the National Register of Historic Places in 1974.

References

Houses on the National Register of Historic Places in North Carolina
Houses completed in 1786
Houses in Stokes County, North Carolina
National Register of Historic Places in Stokes County, North Carolina